ICT Roller Derby (ICTRD) is a women's flat track roller derby league based in Wichita, Kansas. Founded in 2006, ICT was the first roller derby team in Kansas. ICT is a member of the Women's Flat Track Derby Association (WFTDA).

History and organization
ICT was founded as "ICT Roller Girls" in 2006, and celebrated its tenth anniversary in 2016. By 2008, the league had more than forty skaters.  

ICT was accepted into the Women's Flat Track Derby Association Apprentice program in October 2009, and became a full member in June 2010, the first league from Kansas to be accepted. In 2016, ICT served as the host league for one of that year's WFTDA Division 2 Playoffs at the Wichita Sports Forum.

Ahead of the 2017 season, the league rebranded as ICT Roller Derby.

WFTDA rankings

References

Sports in Wichita, Kansas
Roller derby leagues established in 2006
Roller derby leagues in Kansas
Women's Flat Track Derby Association Division 3
2006 establishments in Kansas